Monochamus clamator, the spotted pine sawyer, is a species of beetle in the family Cerambycidae. It was described by John Lawrence LeConte in 1852.

Subspecies
 Monochamus clamator clamator (LeConte, 1852)
 Monochamus clamator latus Casey, 1924
 Monochamus clamator linsleyi Dillon & Dillon, 1941
 Monochamus clamator nevadensis Dillon & Dillon, 1941
 Monochamus clamator rubigineus (Bates, 1880)

References

clamator
Beetles described in 1852